Khaled Mesfin-Mulugeta (born 2 June 1992) is a German former professional footballer who played as a left-back or left midfielder.

Career
Mesfin was born in Addis Ababa, Ethiopia. After failing to make an appearance with Bundesliga sides Eintracht Frankfurt and Hannover 96, he joined SV Waldhof Mannheim in the fourth-tier Regionalliga, making 17 league appearances.

In 2016, he signed for NK Inter Zaprešić in the Croatian First Football League. Despite seeing to stay with the club for the long run, he left after one season.

References

External links
 

Living people
1992 births
German footballers
Association football fullbacks
Association football midfielders
Regionalliga players
Croatian Football League players
Eintracht Frankfurt players
Eintracht Frankfurt II players
Hannover 96 II players
SV Waldhof Mannheim players
NK Inter Zaprešić players
Ethiopian emigrants to Germany